Miss Grand Colombia 2022 was the second edition of the Miss Grand Colombia beauty pageant, held on June 24, 2022, at the Hotel Grand Park, Bogotá. At the end of the event, a twenty-eight-year-old Colombian American from Houston, Priscilla Londoño, was announced the winner, outclassing the other twenty contestants. She then represented Colombia at the parent international contest, Miss Grand International 2022, held on October 25 in Indonesia, where she was placed among the top 10 finalists. On the occasion of celebrating the pageant's first decade anniversary, Priscilla was also assumed by the international organizer to be one of the fifth runners-up, and she then spent a few months of her reign working with the organization in Indonesia and Thailand.

In addition to Miss Grand International 2022, some national finalists of Miss Grand Colombia 2022 were later assigned by the organizer to participate in other international contests, including the second runner-up, Luisa Gonzalez, for the Miss Orb International 2022 in Costa Rica, and Jenny López Bolaños for the Reina del Mundo 2022 pageant in Venezuela.

The event was hosted by Ariel Osorio, and featured a live performance of a Colombian singer, Adriana Lucía. Besides participants with Colombian citizenship, contestants of Colombian descent from other countries were authorized to participate.

Results

Contestants
21 contestants competed for the national title of Miss Grand Colombia 2022.

References

External links

 

Miss Grand Colombia
Grand Colombia